Captain Scarlet is the fictional main character in Gerry Anderson's British Supermarionation science-fiction television series Captain Scarlet and the Mysterons and its computer-animated remake, Gerry Anderson's New Captain Scarlet.

Depiction in Captain Scarlet
Well-trusted by the commander-in-chief of Spectrum, Colonel White, Captain Scarlet is the primary agent of the organisation and is assigned the most dangerous and crucial missions.

He is a close friend of Captain Blue, who is his "field partner" and thus with whom he undertakes the majority of his missions, although he is on friendly terms with all other Spectrum agents. A close relationship with Destiny Angel is also hinted at several times in the series.

Death and resurrection
Captain Scarlet was killed in the first episode of the series, in a car crash brought about by the Mysterons, which also resulted in the death of fellow officer Captain Brown. Both men were reconstructed by the aliens, who assigned their exact likenesses of both men to assassinate the World President. The Captain Brown likeness was turned into a walking bomb for this purpose. When this attempt in New York failed, the Captain Scarlet likeness kidnapped the President from Cloudbase and flew him to England, taking him to the top of the London Car-Vu, a large car park tower. Cornered while holding the President at gunpoint over the city below, the Captain Scarlet likeness was shot by Captain Blue and fell 800 feet to his apparent destruction. However, at the end of the episode it was revealed that Captain Scarlet was returning to life and had become almost incapable of dying permanently, a power called "retro-metabolism", due to the powers of "reversal of matter" that the Mysterons possess, although the fall had broken the Mysteron programming and returned him to his original personality. This extraordinary ability heals Captain Scarlet of physical injuries--and even resurrects him from death--within hours, making him virtually indestructible.

Captain Scarlet's Mysteronised body, like those of all Mysteron likenesses, is still vulnerable to high voltages of electricity and impervious to X-rays. He also has a "sixth sense" when in the presence of a strong Mysteron influence – he becomes nauseated, sweats, and suffers a severe headache – but this sense sometimes does not indicate all Mysteron presences in an area. Though Captain Scarlet "dies" several times in the course of the series – usually quite violently – he always returns to life. In "Attack on Cloudbase", Captain Scarlet is declared finally and permanently dead during the course of the battle for Cloudbase; however, this is later revealed to be Symphony Angel's hallucination as she is stranded in a desert, waiting for Spectrum to rescue her following a plane crash.

Personality

Captain Scarlet, as the main protagonist, is one of the most developed characters in the series. His real name is Paul Metcalfe. He has black hair and blue eyes, speaks with a Mid-Atlantic accent, and is said to be from Winchester, Hampshire, England. He was born on 17 December 2036. He is not unfamiliar with gambling and drinking, even though he has apparently lost his vulnerability to drunkenness; in the episode "Special Assignment", he plays, and loses heavily at, roulette. (This is something he does under direct orders from Colonel White and as part of an undercover mission given to him; Spectrum regulations prohibit gambling, under penalty of the guilty party being asked for his or her resignation, on grounds of its potentials both for inducing compulsions and for inflicting heavy debt that could lead to financial crimes.) In the episode "Flight 104", Captain Scarlet expresses a preference for steak "with all the trimmings".

Captain Scarlet is a competent pilot and can drive almost any vehicle; but in this last, he is only moderately skilled, as he tends to crash Spectrum Pursuit Vehicles (SPVs), the heavy-duty modified tanks that Spectrum employs. (However, this may be attributed to the fact that his virtual indestructibility "permits" him to push the vehicles harder than others might as he knows he will survive whatever happens on the drive.) He is also a qualified astronaut. He is a somewhat stereotypical hero in that he is dependable and always gets the job done although he is not always successful. He does, however, have a lighter side. He also has a rather dry wit and sarcastic sense of humour, often using this in dialogue with other Spectrum agents.

He can turn his hand to a variety of weapons from guns to electric cables. Captain Scarlet is not shown to have any love interests during the series although previous attractions are indicated at some points, and a popular speculation among the fan community of the series is that he has a soft spot for, if not a relationship with, compatriot Rhapsody Angel.

Captain Scarlet has a close friendship with Captain Blue, who acts as Captain Scarlet's "field partner". Captain Blue cares about his friend and Captain Scarlet trusts him implicitly, although he is professional enough to use deadly force against him as necessary when Captain Scarlet was controlled by the Mysterons. In the episode "Special Assignment", Captain Blue tries to stop Captain Scarlet's apparent spiral of self-destruction, showing the bond between them. (It was later revealed that this development was part of a plan to infiltrate a Mysteron attack, the plan being kept secret from Captain Blue so that his reaction to Captain Scarlet's apparent dismissal would be natural.) In the episode "Renegade Rocket", both men are prepared to stay in a missile base targeted by the Mysterons and die in a last-ditch attempt to stop its destruction. Captain Scarlet is also friends with Lieutenant Green, as demonstrated when he accompanies Captain Scarlet and Captain Blue on certain missions. However, Captain Scarlet is friendly with all other Cloudbase personnel, and he has no particular enemies among those with whom he is closely associated.

Depiction in New Captain Scarlet
Born in Winchester, England, Scarlet's mother was Ann Brightman, a British astrophysicist, while his father, Tom Metcalfe, was an American pilot who later joined the International Space Agency. As a boy of ten, Paul watched his father take humankind's first steps on Mars and vowed to follow in his historic footsteps. He studied astrophysics at MIT before joining the US Air Force. However, the outbreak of global terrorist wars, which saw the deaths of both his parents, changed his focus. He transferred to US Special Forces and commanded an elite unit that saw action across the world. His second-in-command was Lieutenant Conrad Lefkon, who became his closest friend. With the end of the wars, a new security organisation was established: Spectrum. Paul was an obvious choice for the new organisation, and took on the codename "Captain Scarlet". His good friend Lefkon was also signed up as "Captain Black".

Scarlet later became Spectrum's special weapon in its "war of nerves" with the Mysterons; a weapon created by the Mysterons themselves when they killed Scarlet during a mission on Mars along with Captain Black. After they had discovered the Mysterons' city, Black fired a destructive shot against it, believing they were under attack. The two men watched in astonishment as the city rebuilt itself and tried to flee, only to be killed. The Mysterons then rebuilt Scarlet as an invincible human replica to infiltrate Earth and lead their war against the planet. While under the control of the Mysterons, Scarlet tried to destroy Skybase, but was stopped in his efforts by Captain Blue. Falling down through a plasma stream, Scarlet was killed, but recovered later on in Sickbay, under the astonished eyes of Doctor Gold and other onlookers, and revealed himself to be fully free of the Mysterons' control. Metcalfe's human psyche had survived and regained control of his physical body. Instead of being killed by the power surge, Scarlet was only harmed temporarily, and was restored to life by the genetic mutation of the Mysteron "retrometabolisation" process which makes him virtually "indestructible".

Scarlet is a dedicated Spectrum officer. First and foremost, he is a soldier on the front line of Earth's defenses. However, he is also tormented by what he has become  not fully human. Utterly fearless and dedicated to saving the human race, for all Scarlet's heroism there is one thing that makes him very uneasy – his growing feelings for Destiny Angel, the girlfriend of his late friend, Black.

Abilities
Through his power of "retrometabolism", Scarlet can survive and heal from any injury, no matter how serious, though his recovery is never instantaneous. Further, in a few episodes, it is stated that he can feel a Mysteron's presence by feeling nauseated and unwell. In the pilot story ("Instrument of Destruction", Parts 1 and 2), it is also stated that Scarlet shared a kind of telepathic link with Captain Black, which Colonel White considers to be an advantage in the war against the Mysterons that he cannot dismiss.

During the episode "Rat Trap", the Mysterons were able to contact Scarlet and to talk to him, while nobody else could hear them. It is not clear if this phenomenon was because he was on the Mysterons' home planet, or if he would hear them, wherever he might be, if they chose to contact him again. In "Chiller", it was revealed that, when particularly badly wounded, Scarlet's body has the capability to separate his emotional and physical selves so that the latter can heal quicker, leaving the former as a ghostlike apparition, detectable only by its coldness.

Background and reception
Commentators consider the original Captain Scarlet's appearance to be based on either Cary Grant, Roger Moore, or the character's voice actor, Francis Matthews. Scarlet's voice is widely acknowledged to be an imitation of Grant's Mid-Atlantic accent. Matthews wrote that he was hired to voice Captain Scarlet because series co-creator Gerry Anderson "had heard my Cary Grant impression on Pete Murray's [radio show] Open House and simply wanted that sound". Anderson, however, said that the impression was Matthews's own choice, and that while it was not what had been intended for Captain Scarlet, the production was happy for him to use it. Kyle Anderson of the website Nerdist.com writes that Matthews's take on Grant "really makes the titular hero seem like a man out of time, which works really well."

In 1995, Matthews expressed surprise at being so well remembered for voicing a puppet character to the exclusion of his other roles, writing: "I think I have spoken many times about how unimportant Captain Scarlet was in my working life 28 years ago, and I can't give the impression that Scarlet has been a big thing in my life since ... [T]o be left with a piece of wood as one's main epitaph is becoming a bit galling!"

Writing for TV Zone in 2002, Thomasina Gibson praised the character: "... [H]ere was a hero, far superior to any that came before. Troy Tempest in his Stingray was far too wet! The Tracy troop in their Thunderbirds – mere boys! No! The only colour that shone for me from the rainbow of agents pitched against Captain Black and the meddling Mysterons was the bright and vibrant Scarlet." Discussing the character's depiction, Stephen La Rivière notes that "one element that was never dwelt upon, or indeed even mentioned again after the first episode, is that the protagonist we follow for the entire series is, in fact, nothing more than a duplicate, a doppelganger; the hero initially introduced to us is killed within two minutes of our first encounter with him." Comparisons have been made with the Whoniverse character Captain Jack Harkness, who has a rapid self-healing power that makes him virtually immortal. Nerdist's Anderson describes Scarlet as a "proto-Captain Jack. He dies, but can always rejuvenate."

Criticism
Jim Sangster and Paul Condon, authors of Collins Telly Guide (2005), argue that the character's "indestructibility" reduces his credibility as a hero: "He'll survive no matter what they throw at him, which should mean that there's zero tension in anything he takes on." Daniel O'Brien offers a similar assessment, identifying this ability as a "possible miscalculation" on the part of the series creators. In support of his argument, he points to a scene in the episode "Attack on Cloudbase" in which Lieutenant Green scoffs, "Anyone can be brave if they're indestructible." Commenting on the 2000s remake, Andrew Billen noted that the new version of the character was referred to as being "virtually indestructible", arguing that the use of a qualifier made the premise more exciting and "fixed every child's main objection" to the original series.

John Peel believes Captain Scarlet's self-healing power to be a major weakness of the original series. He also suggests that the character served as a poor role model to the "impressionable children" who made up most of the audience: "Parents didn't like their children watching a show that appeared to be encouraging them to hero-worship someone who was indestructible." He cites Batman as another 1960s TV series whose young viewers "sometimes tried to copy their heroes, often with nasty or lethal results." Peel believes that the incitement to act dangerously is sustained by the series's lyrical closing theme music, which includes the lines "They crash him, and his body may burn" and "They smash him, but they know he'll return ... to live again." These lyrics led production company Century 21 to make an alternative set of opening titles featuring a disclaimer, in the form of a voice-over by Donald Gray in character as Colonel White, warning: "Captain Scarlet is indestructible. You are NOT. Remember this. Do not try to imitate him!"

Religious allegory
Captain Scarlet has also been interpreted as part of a supposed religious allegory in the series. Various sources have commented on the idea that the character's self-healing ability makes him an analogue of the resurrected Jesus. Actor Cy Grant, who voiced the original Lieutenant Green, made several observations on the series's alleged religious symbolism. He believed that Colonel White and Captain Scarlet symbolised God and the Son of God, while Captain Scarlet's nemesis, Captain Black, represented the Devil. La Rivière and others note that like the ascended Christ, Captain Scarlet lives in the sky with Angels – on Spectrum's airborne headquarters Cloudbase, which is defended by a fighter squadron codenamed "the Angels". But Gerry Anderson always denied that any of this symbolism was intentional.

Adaptation
In the BBC Past Doctor Adventures series – a series of novels based on Doctor Who, featuring the first seven incarnations of the Doctor in original adventures – the novel The Indestructible Man by Simon Messingham draws heavily on Gerry Anderson's shows in general and Captain Scarlet in particular, with an organization known as 'PRISM' acting against the mysterious Myloki with the aid of Captain Grant Matthews (named after Cary Grant and Francis Matthews), transformed into an indestructible state when he was killed and duplicated by the Myloki to such a degree that his original personality asserted itself. In keeping with the adult nature of this interpretation, Grant Matthews is presented as being tormented by his immortality, various sources noting that he is technically only a copy of Grant Matthews rather than being the original man in a new body, ideas that may have been suggested but never analysed regarding Captain Scarlet's nature in the original show.

In music
Captain Scarlet is referred to by The Kinks in the song "Daylight", on their album Preservation Act 1.

References

Works cited

First published as: 

American male characters in television
American superheroes
British superheroes
Captain Scarlet (franchise) characters
Extraterrestrial superheroes
Fictional astronauts
Fictional characters with accelerated healing
Fictional characters with death or rebirth abilities
Fictional characters with precognition
Fictional English people
Fictional Massachusetts Institute of Technology people
Fictional military captains
Fictional murdered people
Fictional telepaths
Fictional United States Air Force personnel
Fictional United States Army Special Forces personnel
Male characters in animated series
Male characters in television
Male superheroes
Television characters introduced in 1967
Television superheroes